Jane Beatrice Galletly (née Toft, 24 May 1928 – 12 December 2017) was a British-born New Zealand television scriptwriter. Her credits include Close to Home and Shark in the Park in New Zealand, EastEnders and Eldorado in Britain, and The Sullivans in Australia.

References

1928 births
2017 deaths
People from Staveley, Derbyshire
British emigrants to New Zealand
New Zealand screenwriters
New Zealand women screenwriters